Osedax rubiplumus is a species of bathypelagic Polychaetes that is reported to sustain itself on the bones of dead whales.

Description
The female ovisac is measured 8 mm by 4 mm by 0.3 mm, with four posterior roots which have spherical lobes. The species is found in East North Pacific where it is abundant. They are used in Calmodulin.

References

Sabellida
Animals described in 2004